Utah Women 2020 is a mural in Salt Lake City, Utah, United States. The mural depicts more than 250 influential women.

References

External links

 

2020 works
Murals in Utah
Public art in Utah